Mathias Broothaerts is a Belgian athletics competitor who competes primarily in the long jump, Broothaerts has also competed professionally in the 100 metres and 4 x 100 metres relay the last time being in 2013.

Career

Broothaerts began his career in 2010 during the Youth Olympics first in the 100 metre and later in the long jump. He did not qualify for the 100 meter final and finished in 7th in the long jump. In 2012, at the Belgian Athletics Championships, his first time at the event he finished in 2nd in long jump earning himself a silver medal. Broothaerts competed in the Belgian indoor and outdoor championships in 2012 finishing 2nd and 3rd respectively.

In 2014 after strong showings at domestic and international competition Broothaerts qualified for the 2014 European Athletics Championships however he finished in 25th and was eliminated from competition. However after the competition Broothaerts thanked his fans for the support and vowed he would return better.

Personal bests
 Outdoor 
 Long jump — 8.07 m. in 2014
 100 metre — 10.85 sec. in 2017.
 Indoor
 Long jump — 7.66 m. in 2014

References

External links

 
 
 
 Mathias Broothaerts at Eurosport.com
 

1994 births
Living people
Belgian male long jumpers
Belgian male sprinters
People from Wilrijk
Belgian Athletics Championships winners